State Trunk Highway 186 (often called Highway 186, STH-186 or WIS 186) is a  state highway in the U.S. state of Wisconsin. It runs from its southern terminus at Wisconsin Highway 13 and Wisconsin Highway 73 south of Vesper to U.S. Route 10 in Auburndale. The highway is located entirely within Wood County. Like all Wisconsin state highways, WIS 186 is maintained by the Wisconsin Department of Transportation (WisDOT).

Route description

WIS 186 begins south of Vesper at a four-way intersection with WIS 73. South of the intersection, the road continues as County Road D. WIS 186 heads north toward Vesper and enters the village from the south as Wisconsin Street. It turns northwest in the middle of the village and leaves it as Cameron Avenue. Outside of Vesper, WIS 186 turns north again before curving west towards Arpin. The highway continues west until it is south of Arpin, at which point it turns north and passes through the village. It continues north until it terminates at an intersection with US 10 and WIS 13 just before Auburndale.

History

WisDOT designated WIS 186 in 1947 along former County Highway M. WIS 186 has not changed its routing since its establishment. The bridges were the focus of a $1.15 million WisDOT project. Later in 2003, a lumber truck crashed into another vehicle at the intersection of WIS 186 and WIS 13; the truck's logs spilled onto the highway, and both roads were closed for several hours to clean up the lumber.

Major intersections

See also

References

External links

186
Transportation in Wood County, Wisconsin